The Ancient Monuments Protection Act 1882 was an Act of the Parliament of the United Kingdom of Great Britain and Ireland (as it then was). It was introduced by John Lubbock, 1st Baron Avebury, recognising the need for a governmental administration on the protection of ancient monuments, and was finally passed after a number of failed attempts on heritage protection acts. The gradual change towards a state-based authority responsible for the safeguarding of the Kingdom's national heritage manifested itself through the appointment of the first Inspector of Ancient Monuments in 1882, General Pitt Rivers.

Development of the legislation 
According to Halfin, "Lubbock's Bill came at a time when England was among the last of the European nations to be completely without protective legislation for cultural property. Many of his ideas were borrowed from a long history of royal and aristocratic interest in preservation that was prevalent in Europe during the nineteenth century. In particular, Lubbock was strongly influenced by the Abbé Gregoire, who had so successfully championed the cause of cultural preservation in France."

The first introduction of the bill in 1873 was controversial because it envisioned the government being able to compulsorily purchase monuments on privately owned land if the owner decided to develop the land. By the Act's passage in 1882, these provisions had been removed from the bill.

The schedule

The 1882 Act contains a schedule of the initial 68 sites that were covered by the legislation. These are almost all pre-historic monuments, some of the most famous such sites in the country among them, alongside some that were felt to be at particular risk at the time.

England and Wales
There were 26 English sites listed in the schedule, in just 10 counties, including seven sites in Wiltshire. Welsh monuments were represented by one site in each of north, south and west Wales.

Scotland
The 1882 schedule included 21 monuments, the majority of which are prehistoric sites. Two are Neolithic, five Bronze Age, eight Iron Age and six from early Christian/Pictish periods, although two of the prehistoric stones also have notable early Christian additions. Those sites now in the care of Historic Scotland are indicated with '(HS)'.

Ireland
In 1882 the whole of Ireland was under British administration. Subsequent legislation for Ireland used the terminology of historic monuments, which continues in Northern Ireland. Three sites in the schedule are in what became Northern Ireland, one being in County Armagh and two in County Down. The fifteen sites now in the Republic of Ireland are protected by the National Monuments Service and include two world heritage sites. As with England and Wales, the 1882 selection was overwhelmingly those thought to be prehistoric sites, although there is now uncertainty over the age of many sites.

See also
Ancient Monuments Protection Act 1900
Ancient Monuments Protection Act 1910
Ancient Monuments Consolidation and Amendment Act 1913
Ancient Monuments and Archaeological Areas Act 1979
 Reproduced copy of 1882 Act
List of prehistoric structures in Great Britain

References
The Construction of Built Heritage 

United Kingdom Acts of Parliament 1882
Archaeology of the United Kingdom
Historic preservation legislation
Conservation in the United Kingdom
Lists of monuments and memorials in the United Kingdom